Tai Lam Centre for Women is a maximum security women's prison in Tuen Mun, New Territories, Hong Kong. It is operated by Hong Kong Correctional Services and currently has a capacity of 391 prisoners. It was established in 1969.

As of 1992 illegal immigrants from Mainland China were placed in Tai Lam, and the prison was overcrowded by about 60%. At one time the prison held 817 prisoners even though its facilities were officially for 278 prisoners.

As of 1997 only two male prison guards had contact with the female prisoners: the technical instructor and superintendent.

Notable prisoners
 Agnes Chow - activist
 Nancy Kissel - perpetrator of the murder of Robert Kissel
 Pamela Pak

References

External links

 Tai Lam Centre for Women

1969 establishments in Hong Kong
Women's prisons in China
Prisons in Hong Kong